Arigoma Mayero Chiponda (born 3 March 1958) is a Zimbabwean boxer. He competed in the men's middleweight event at the 1984 Summer Olympics. At the 1984 Summer Olympics, he lost to Tom Corr of Ireland

References

External links
 

1958 births
Living people
Zimbabwean male boxers
Olympic boxers of Zimbabwe
Boxers at the 1984 Summer Olympics
Place of birth missing (living people)
Middleweight boxers